The International Journal of Approximate Reasoning (IJAR) is a peer-reviewed academic journal in operations research. It was founded in 1987  by Jim Bezdek, and is published on a monthly basis by Elsevier, with Thierry Denoeux as its Editor-in-Chief.

References

Mathematics journals
Computer science journals
Publications established in 1987
Monthly journals